Jooseppi Julius (J. J.) Mikkola (July 6, 1866, Ylöjärvi – September 28, 1946, Helsinki), was Finnish linguist and professor. Mikkola is regarded as one of the most important Finnish linguists of Slavic languages of his era.

Biography

Mikkola's parents were farmer Antti Erland Mikkola and Johanna Mikkola. Mikkola graduated in 1886.

In 1893 Mikkola married Finnish author Maila Talvio.

Books 
 Berührungen zwischen den westfinnischen und slavischen Sprachen, väitöskirja. Finsk-ugriska sällskapet, Helsingfors 1893–1895
 Betonung und Quantität in den westslavischen Sprachen. W. Hagelstam, Helsingfors 1899
 Kansallinen liike Böömissä. Kansanvalistusseura 1903
 Ladoga, Laatokka. Finsk-ugriska sällskapet, Helsingfors 1906
 Urslavische Grammatik : Einführung in das vergleichende Studium der slavischen Sprachen, 1 Teil – Lautlehre, Vokalismus, Betonung. Carl Winter's Universitätsbuchhandlung, Heidelberg 1913
 Die chronologie der turkischen Donaubulgaren. Suomalais-ugrilainen seura 1914
 Slaavilaiset kansat ajanlukumme ensimmäisellä vuosituhannella. Porvoo 1916
 Zur Vertretung der Gutturale und tj in den lateinischen Lehnwörtern des Germanischen und Slavischen. Société néophilologique, Helsingfors 1924
 Suomen ja suomalais-ugrilaisten kielten tutkimus. Helsinki 1929
 Kaksi pyhää Henrikkiä koskevaa muistiinpanoa, kirjoittajat Aarno Maliniemi ja J. J. Mikkola. Helsinki 1930
 Englantilais-suomalais-ruotsalais-saksalainen merisanasto, toimttaneet J. J. Mikkola ja R[udolf] Dillström. WSOY 1931
 Inkerinmaan kreikanuskoisten käännytyksestä vuosina 1683–1700. Suomen historiallinen seura, Helsinki 1932
 Antti Jalava tshekkiläisiin tutustumassa. Helsinki 1937
 Muutamia tietoja kenraali Casimir Ehrnroothin toiminnasta Bulgarian hallitusmiehenä. Helsinki 1938
 Onko suomen silta balttilaista alkuperää? Helsinki 1938
 Die älteren Berührungen zwischen Ostseefinnisch und Russisch. Suomalais-ugrilainen seura 1938
 Hämärän ja sarastuksen ajoilta. WSOY 1939
 Reposaaren nimestä, teoksessa Satakunta XI. 1939
 Kolttakylän arkisto, Lapin sivistysseuran julkaisuja n:o 8. WSOY 1941
 Lännen ja idän rajoilta : : historiallisia kirjoitelmia. WSOY 1942
 Urslavische Grammatik : Einführung in das vergleichende Studium der slavischen Sprachen, 2 Teil – Konsonantismus. Carl Winter's Universitätsbuchhandlung, Heidelberg 1942
 Urslavische Grammatik : Einführung in das vergleichende Studium der slavischen Sprachen, 3 Teil – Formenlehre. Carl Winter's Universitätsverlag, Heidelberg 1950

Footnotes

External links
 
 Jooseppi Mikkola in 375 humanists. Faculty of Arts, University of Helsinki. 17.7.2015.

Balticists
Finnish diplomats
Academic staff of the University of Helsinki
1866 births
1946 deaths
Linguists from Finland